Art dolls are objects of art, rather than children's toys, created in a wide variety of styles and media, and may include both pre-manufactured parts or wholly original works.

History

Art dolls production demand a wide range of skills and technologies, including sculpting, painting, and costuming. They are often multimedia objects made from materials such as fabric, paperclay, polymer clay, wax, wood, porcelain, natural or synthetic hair, yarn, wool, and felt. As works of art, art dolls can take weeks or months to finish.

One-of-a-kind (OOAK) art dolls may command prices in the thousands of dollars; publications featuring established and emerging doll artists support collection, and artist groups, such as the National Institute of American Doll Artists (NIADA), promote the art form.

There is an entire industry related to the mediums used in creating art dolls. Sculpting from clay is very prevalent. There are many varieties including air-dry, polymer clay, modeling clay to paperclay. Some top brands include ProSculpt, Sculpey, La Doll, and Creative Paperclay.

Selected examples
2008's Melbourne Fringe Festival featured the work of Rachel Hughes and curator Sayraphim Lothian, amongst others. The elaborate ball-jointed ceramic dolls of Marina Bychkova fetch prices from $5,000 to $45,000, and are collected by the likes of Louis Vuitton designers. In 2010, Facebook banned images of an art doll by Bychkova posted by Sydney jeweller Victoria Buckley; included were images of a semi-naked doll used to display jewellery in her shop window. Eco-designer, Ryan Jude Novelline, created a commemorative art doll from a vintage Barbie recognizing  marriage equality in the United States in June 2015.

See also
 Hans Bellmer
 OOAK
 Repaint

References

External links

 National Institute of American Doll Artists
 Original Doll Artists Council of America
 Art Doll Quarterly

Dolls